Marshal Hylon Pengra (January 18, 1819 – May 13, 1908) was a member of the Wisconsin State Assembly.

Biography
Pengra was born Darien, New York in January 1819. Sources have differed on the exact date. On April 16, 1840, he married Elvira Lyon. They had six children. Pengra was a resident of Sylvester, Wisconsin, where he was a farm owner.

Political career
Pengra served as a grand juror on the circuit court in 1862. He was elected to the Assembly in 1870 and 1871. Additionally, he was Chairman of the Town Board (similar to city council), Clerk and Assessor of Sylvester, a member of the County Board of Commissioners (similar to board of supervisors) of Green County, Wisconsin and a justice of the peace. He acted with the Republican Party after its creation.

References

External links
 

People from Darien, New York
People from Green County, Wisconsin
Republican Party members of the Wisconsin State Assembly
Wisconsin city council members
County supervisors in Wisconsin
American justices of the peace
Farmers from Wisconsin
1819 births
1908 deaths
19th-century American politicians
19th-century American judges